Lentinellus vulpinus is a species of fungus belonging to the family Auriscalpiaceae.

It has a cosmopolitan distribution. Like all species in its genus, it is inedible due to its bitterness.

References

External links
Lentinellus vulpinus occurrence data from GBIF

Russulales
Inedible fungi
Taxa named by James Sowerby